Saint-Edmond-les-Plaines is a municipality in the Canadian province of Quebec, located within the regional county municipality of Maria-Chapdelaine. The municipality had a population of 390 as of the Canada 2011 Census.

Before November 27, 2004, it was known simply as Saint-Edmond.

Demographics
Population trend:
 Population in 2011: 390 (2006 to 2011 population change: -9.7%)
 Population in 2006: 432
 Population in 2001: 518
 Population in 1996: 585
 Population in 1991: 592

Private dwellings occupied by usual residents: 167 (total dwellings: 179)

Mother tongue:
 English as first language: 0%
 French as first language: 100%
 English and French as first language: 0%
 Other as first language: 0%

References

Municipalities in Quebec
Incorporated places in Saguenay–Lac-Saint-Jean
Maria-Chapdelaine Regional County Municipality